Soultana "Tania" Chalivera (born March 5, 1985) is a Greek professional basketball player who plays for Olympiacos in the Greek Women's Basketball League. She is a 1.78m shooting guard.

References

External links 
 FIBA profile

Living people
Greek women's basketball players
Olympiacos Women's Basketball players
1985 births
Guards (basketball)
Basketball players from Larissa